René Bouin (23 April 1937 – 7 October 2018) was a French politician who served as a Deputy from 2002 to 2007, and as Mayor of Chenillé-Changé from 1977 to 2001. He was a member of the Union for a Popular Movement.

References

1937 births
2018 deaths
Deputies of the 12th National Assembly of the French Fifth Republic
Mayors of places in Pays de la Loire
Union for a Popular Movement politicians
People from Maine-et-Loire